Jesús González Romero (born April 18, 1969) is a Mexican football manager and former player.

References

External links

1969 births
Living people
Association football defenders
Deportivo Toluca F.C. players
Mexican football managers
Footballers from the State of Mexico
People from Toluca
Mexican footballers